Nathalie Kelley  is a Peruvian-born Australian actress, known for her role as Neela in the 2006 action film The Fast and the Furious: Tokyo Drift, and for her roles in various television series including Body of Proof (2011–2012), Unreal (2015), The Vampire Diaries (2016–2017), Dynasty (2017–2018) and The Baker and the Beauty (2020).

Early life
Kelley was born March 3, 1984, in Lima, Peru, to a Peruvian mother and an Argentine father. They moved to Sydney when she was three. From a young age, she dreamed about being an actress. She attended North Sydney Girls High School.

Career
In 2005, Charmed executive producers Brad Kern, Aaron Spelling and E. Duke Vincent developed a one-hour pilot for The WB titled Mermaid. Kelley was cast as the series protagonist Nikki, a mermaid who is rescued by a young man when she washes ashore in Miami. The pilot was not picked up as a result of The WB and UPN merging into The CW; the resulting network passed on the show.

In June 2006, Kelley received her breakout role as Neela in the film The Fast and the Furious: Tokyo Drift, the third installment of Fast & Furious franchise. In March 2008, Kelley appeared in the low-budget drama crime film Loaded alongside Jesse Metcalfe. In March 2011, Kelley had a small role in the retro comedy film Take Me Home Tonight, which starred Topher Grace, Anna Faris and fellow Australian Teresa Palmer. The film was shot in Los Angeles in 2007 but its release was delayed by Universal Pictures for unknown reasons. The following month, Kelley appeared as the protagonist in the low-budget horror film Urban Explorer, which follows a group of four urban explorers who explore an underground world beneath metropolitan Berlin.

In 2010, Kelley played the love interest in the music video for the Bruno Mars song "Just the Way You Are". In August 2011, Kelley signed on in a major recurring role in the second season of the ABC crime drama television series Body of Proof. Kelley appeared as Dani Alvarez in ten episodes and made her final appearance in the episode "Going Viral Part One". In 2012, Kelley played a vampire princess in the video clip "Luna Llena" from Puerto Rican reggaeton duo Baby Rasta & Gringo. In 2014, she won a regular role in the Lifetime series Unreal. In 2016, Kelley was cast as Carmen Castillo in the TV pilot sequel to the 1999 film Cruel Intentions, but the project did not go to series. From 2016 to 2017, Kelley appeared as Sybil in the final season of The CW television series The Vampire Diaries.

Kelley starred as Cristal in the first season of The CW's Dynasty reboot, from 2017 to 2018. In 2020, she debuted in the lead role of Noa Hamilton in the ABC series The Baker and the Beauty.

Personal life
Kelley used to date Zach Roerig, her co-star from The Vampire Diaries. They separated in 2017.

Kelley began dating Jordan "Jordy" Burrows in 2018. That April, she confirmed in an Instagram post that they were engaged, and they married on 29 April 2018. They separated in 2020.

Filmography

Film

Television

Music videos

References

External links

21st-century Australian actresses
Actresses from Sydney
Australian film actresses
Australian people of Argentine descent
Australian people of Peruvian descent
Living people
People educated at North Sydney Girls High School
People from Lima
Peruvian emigrants to Australia
Peruvian people of Argentine descent
Year of birth missing (living people)